Wabbaseka-Tucker School District, previously the Wabbaseka School District No. 7, was a school district in Jefferson County, Arkansas, serving Wabbaseka, Tucker, and Plum Bayou.

The district operated two schools: Wabbaseka Elementary School and Wabbaseka High School. At one time the district also operated Tucker Elementary School.

History
By the 1980s the administration of the Plum Bayou-Tucker School District sought to be annexed by the Wabbaseka School District due to financial difficulties; the Plum Bayou-Tucker district was to be dissolved with Wabbaseka absorbing the new territory. On July 1, 1983, the consolidation into the Wabbaseka Tucker School District occurred. The former Plum Bayou-Tucker district had employed 21 teachers; the consolidated district retained 19 of them.

In 1989 the district had 283 students.

On September 1, 1993, the Wabbaseka-Tucker district consolidated with the Altheimer-Sherrill School District to form the Altheimer Unified School District. The territory merged into the Dollarway School District on July 10, 2006. and it joined the Pine Bluff School District effective July 1, 2021.

References

External links
  (Download) - Includes boundaries of predecessor school districts (Wabbaseka and Plum Bayou-Tucker)

Defunct school districts in Arkansas
Education in Jefferson County, Arkansas
1993 disestablishments in Arkansas
School districts disestablished in 1993
1983 establishments in Arkansas
School districts established in 1983